Hermann Becker (born 1887) was a German First World War fighter ace credited with 23 confirmed aerial victories as a member of a fighter squadron, Jagdstaffel 12.

The victory list

The victories of Hermann Becker are reported in chronological order, which is not necessarily the order or dates the victories were confirmed by headquarters.
Abbreviations were expanded by the editor creating this list.

Footnote

Citations

Sources  

 
 

Aerial victories of Becker, Hermann
Becker, Hermann